The Salinas Californian, sometimes referred to as The Californian, is a digital and print newspaper published in Salinas, California, covering mainly the Salinas Valley. Founded in 1871 as The Salinas City Index, it went through several name changes and assumed its current name during World War II. The paper is part of the USA Today Network, owned by  Gannett, which acquired its parent company Speidel Newspapers Inc., in 1977.

History 
The Salinas Californian’s direct precursor The Salinas City Index first published on March 31. 1871.  It changed its name into Salinas Weekly Index in 1883.

As Salinas went through a period of agricultural and financial expansion in the years between 1860 and 1890, the existence of The Salinas Weekly Index, and two other publications, Salinas Weekly Democrat and Salinas Daily Journal, was seen as evidence that the city was “one of the most modern for its size in the state” in the late 1800s.

The paper changed its name into Salinas Index-Journal in 1928, after merger with The Salinas Daily-Journal. In 1936 the newspaper was bought by Merritt C. Speidel.

In 1942, Salinas Index-Journal merged with Salinas Morning Post. The combined publication was renamed The Salinas Californian in honor of California's first newspaper, The Californian, published in 1848 in Monterey. The paper was renamed The Californian in 1990, but was still referred to as The Salinas Californian.

In May 1977, Gannett purchased Speidel Newspapers Inc., and has remained owner of The Salinas Californian ever since.

Publication 
The Salinas Californian has issued newspapers from Monday to Saturday since its inception until Sept. 28, 2015. It has never produced a Sunday Edition. It now has a 24-hour, 7-day digital presence and prints newspapers Wednesday, Friday, and Saturday only.

The paper serves the Monterey County, California with a specific emphasis on the Salinas Valley. Its delivery area includes the towns of Salinas, Spreckels, Prunedale, Castroville, Chualar, Gonzales, Soledad, Greenfield, and King City. Daily delivery is also available in Monterey, Marina, Seaside, Del Rey Oaks, and Pacific Grove.

The Salinas Californian also produces El Sol de Salinas, a Spanish-language weekly paper.

Its online edition was launched in September 2000.

Circulation 
In 2015, The Salinas Californian’s circulation stood between 6,000 and 7,000 during the week, slightly higher on Saturdays.

Staff 
Silas Lyons is the Executive Editor. The paper's reporters include Kate Cimini and David Rodriguez

References

External links

Gannett publications
Daily newspapers published in California
Mass media in Salinas, California
Mass media in Monterey County, California
Companies based in Monterey County, California
1871 establishments in California
Publications established in 1871